This is a list of notable businesswomen from India.

Banking and finance
Archana Bhargava, Chairman and Managing Director, United Bank of India 
Arundhati Bhattacharya, Chairperson, State Bank of India (since October 7, 2013) - now retired
Bala Deshpande, MD, New Enterprise Associates India 
Chanda Kochhar (born 1961), ICICI Bank Former MD and CEO
Chitra Ramkrishna, Former Managing Director and CEO, National Stock Exchange of India
Kalpana Morparia, CEO of South Asia and India Operations at JPMorgan Chase
Manisha Girotra, CEO, Moelis India
Naina Lal Kidwai, Group General Manager and Country Head of HSBC India
Renuka Ramnath, founder of Multiples Alternate Asset Management
Shikha Sharma (born 1960), AXIS Bank Former CEO - now retired
Snehlata Shrivastava, Executive Director, National Bank for Agriculture and Rural Development
Usha Sangwan, Managing Director, Life Insurance Corporation of India

Real estate and construction
Sheila Sri Prakash, Chief Architect and Founder of Shilpa Architects; Independent Board Director of Chennai Smart Cities Ltd and Chairperson of the Board of Directors of Nirmana Investments

Books, art and media
Shobhana Bhartia (born 1957), Chairperson and Editorial Director of the Hindustan Times Group
Ekta Kapoor (born 1975), TV and movie producer, Joint Managing Director and Creative Director of Balaji Telefilms
Ritu Kumar (born 1944), fashion designer
Zarina Mehta, Chief Creative Officer of Broadcasting at UTV
Chiki Sarkar, publisher, Penguin Books India
Ashvini Yardi, Programming Head of TV channel Colors

Equipment
Tanya Dubash, Executive Director and President (Marketing) of Godrej Group
Sulajja Firodia Motwani, Joint Managing Director of Kinetic Engineering
Lila Poonawalla, former CEO of Alfa Laval India and TetraPak India
Mallika Srinivasan (born 1959), CEO of Tafe Motors And Tractors Limited
Dr Chandrakanta K Mature, president woman chamber of commerce

Food  and beverages
Vinita Bali (born 1955), former MD of Britannia Industries Limited
Indra Nooyi (born 1955), Former Chairman and CEO of PepsiCo

Health  and medicine
Kiran Mazumdar-Shaw (born 1953), Chairman and Managing Director of Biocon
Swati Piramal, Vice Chairperson, Piramal Enterprises
Preetha Reddy, Managing Director of Apollo Hospitals Group
Ameera Shah, CEO and Managing Director, Metropolis Healthcare

Hotels and catering
Priya Paul (born 1967), Chairperson of Apeejay Surrendra Park Hotels

Information technology
Divya Jain, founder of dLoop
Aruna Jayanthi, CEO India Capgemini
Roshni Nadar (born 1972), Executive Director and CEO of HCL Corporation

Others
Meena Ganesh, CEO and Managing Director, Pearson Education Services
Jyoti Gogte (born 1956), Indian entrepreneur
Nabomita Mazumdar, businesswoman
Zia Mody (born 1956), legal consultant, managing partner of AZB & Partners
Smriti Nagpal, CEO of Atulyakala
Leena Nair (born 1969), Executive Director, HR, Hindustan Unilever
Lavanya Nalli, vice chairman of Nalli Group of Companies
Rajani Pandit, founder of the Rajani Investigative Bureau

References

External links

Most powerful women in Indian business, Business Today
8 Indians Among Asia's Top 50 Businesswomen, Silicon India

 
businesswomen
+Women